Pechenihy Raion was a raion (district) in Kharkiv Oblast of Ukraine. Its administrative center was the urban-type settlement of Pechenihy. The raion was abolished on 18 July 2020 as part of the administrative reform of Ukraine, which reduced the number of raions of Kharkiv Oblast to seven.

After the reform in 2020 Pechenihy raion was substituted by Pechenihy settlement hromada (community) of approximately the same size, and as such it became a part of an enlarged Chuhuiv Raion, with a total population of 202,200

At the time of disestablishment, the raion consisted of one hromada, Pechenihy settlement hromada with the administration in Pechenihy.

References

Former raions of Kharkiv Oblast
1923 establishments in Ukraine
Ukrainian raions abolished during the 2020 administrative reform
Chuhuiv Raion